Kayk is a village in the Aparan Municipality of the Aragatsotn Province of Armenia located 29 km away from Ashtarak 1850 meters above the sea level. The population migrated to Kayk during 1828-1929 from villages of Alashkert, Mush, Khoy, and Salmast regions. It was renamed Kayk in 2006.

Further reading

References

Populated places in Aragatsotn Province